Aurach is a river in the Bavarian Landkreise (districts) of Ansbach and Roth, Germany.

The name means "river, where the Aurochs' graze" (Old High German ūr = Auerochs and aha = flowing water).

It flows almost  eastward until it flows into the Rednitz. On its way, it passes the villages of Aich (Neuendettelsau, Bertholdsdorf (Windsbach) Veitsaurach (Windsbach), Barthelmesaurach (Kammerstein), Gauchsdorf (Büchenbach and Rothaurach (Roth).

Like most of the western tributaries of the Rednitz, the Aurach has a small slope and a small runoff as well as sand structures in the waterfront and in the waters of the river.

In the past, the Aurach drove a mill about every two miles. These were for example the Hammerschmiede, Geichsenmühle, Mausenmühle, Steinmühle, Buckenmühle, Hasenmühle, Neumühle, and Hebresmühle as well as those at Gauchsdorf and Rothaurach and the Lohmühle near Roth. Today, the hydropower of Aurach has lost its importance.

At Petersaurach, Mausendorf, Veitsaurach, Barthelmesaurach, Götzenreuth, Breitenlohe, Aurau, and Rothaurach, the Aurach takes up the purified sewage water from the respective purification plants.

The majority of the course of the river Aurach in the district of Roth is located in the landscape protection area No. 00428.01.

See also

List of rivers of Bavaria

References

Rivers of Bavaria
Rivers of Germany